Dafydd Jenkins (born 5 December 2002) is a Welsh international rugby union player currently playing for Premiership Rugby side Exeter Chiefs as a Lock. Jenkins has represented Wales and Wales U20.

Club career
Born in Bridgend, Jenkins began playing rugby for Porthcawl RFC juniors, where he progressed through the age groups. Jenkins attended Porthcawl Comprehensive School before transferring to Hartpury College, where he also played rugby. Prior to leaving Wales, Jenkins was part of the Ospreys academy. While playing for Hartpury, Jenkins was contacted by Exeter head coach Rob Baxter, and he linked up with their team in 2021.

Jenkins studies sports sciences at the University of Exeter. He has played for their rugby team in the BUCS Super Rugby tournament, and was named man of the match when Exeter won the tournament, defeating Durham 14–13, scoring a try in the final.

On 13 November 2021, Jenkins made his Exeter Chiefs debut in the Premiership Rugby Cup defeat to Bristol. On 15 January 2022, Jenkins appeared as a replacement in the Champions Cup victory over Glasgow.

Jenkins first Premiership start came in the Round 15 defeat to Wasps on 5 February 2022.

On 12 November 2022, Jenkins set the Premiership record as youngest player named captain, at 19 years and 342 days old, in a victory over London Irish.

International career
Jenkins was called up to the Wales under-20 squad for the first time ahead of the 2021 Six Nations Under 20s Championship, making his debut in the 25–8 victory over Italy. On 28 January 2022, Jenkins was again called into the Wales under-20 squad for the upcoming 2022 Six Nations Under 20s Championship.

On 14 November 2022, Jenkins was called up for Wales as injury cover in the 2022 Autumn Internationals.

Jenkins made his international debut on 19 November 2022, coming off the bench against Georgia.

On 17 January 2023, Jenkins was named in the Wales squad for the 2023 Six Nations Championship. He made his Six Nations debut on 4 February 2023, coming off the bench against Ireland. The following week, Jenkins made his first start for Wales, against Scotland.

Personal life 
Jenkins is the son of Hywel Jenkins, who played as a back row for Swansea and Neath. Hywel represented Wales A and Wales in an uncapped match against the United States, but did not attain a full senior cap.

References

External links

 Exeter profile
 WRU profile

2002 births
Living people
Rugby union locks
Exeter Chiefs players
People educated at Porthcawl Comprehensive School
Alumni of Hartpury College
Alumni of the University of Exeter
Welsh rugby union players
Rugby union players from Bridgend
Wales international rugby union players